Huseynagha Sultan oghlu Hajibababeyov (19 May 1898 – 10 November 1972) was an Azerbaijani opera singer. He was awarded the title, People's Artists of the Azerbaijan SSR (1938). He was the grandfather of jazz composer and pianist, Salman Gambarov.

Biography
Huseynagha Hajibababeyov was born in 1898 in Shamakhy, Russian Empire. 

He had a soft-tone voice and performed mugham and folk songs. From 1910 he sang in the Nijat Society choir in Baku, and from 1913 performed with the Shafa theater group. In 1916, he joined the Azerbaijani music troupe and played mainly female characters in the first Azerbaijani mugham operas, touring cities of the South Caucasus, Central Asia and Iran. Since 1920, he was a soloist of the Azerbaijan State Opera and Ballet Theatre and performed the parts of Shah Ismayil (Shah Ismayil by Muslim Magomayev), Garib (Ashig Garib by Zulfugar Hajibeyov), Khosrov (Khosrov and Shirin by Niyazi), and other parts in operas by European, Georgian, Russian, Armenian composers in the original languages. In 1928, he graduated from the Azerbaijan State Conservatory where his teacher was Russian opera singer Nikolai Speransky. In 1938, Hajibababeyov was awarded the title of the People's Artists of the Azerbaijan SSR.

Roles played
Huseynagha Hajibababeyov is known for the following roles:

See also
List of People's Artists of the Azerbaijan SSR

References

1898 births
1972 deaths
20th-century Azerbaijani male opera singers
People's Artists of the Azerbaijan SSR
Recipients of the Order of the Red Banner of Labour
Soviet Azerbaijani people
People from Shamakhi
Burials at II Alley of Honor